Balle Mallarada Puje is a Hindu marriage ritual performed in some parts of Karnataka.Worship of bangles and presentation of bangles to married women is believed to be productive for an ideal married life to the person whoso worships and presents them. This ceremony is known as Balle Mallarada Puje

The next ritual is Pade Puje

Hindu wedding rituals